Edward Copeland or Ed Copeland might refer to:

Edward Copeland, English footballer
Ted Copeland, English football coach
Eddie Copeland, Irish republican
Edmund Copeland, University of Nottingham professor of physics